Suing the Pope is a March 2002 documentary by Colm O'Gorman and the BBC which details the abusive activities of priest Sean Fortune and the response of the diocese of Ferns to his activities over the years.

As a result, bishop Brendan Comiskey, the bishop of Ferns, resigned due to his perceived mishandling of the case. He had described  Fortune as being "virtually impossible to deal with."

The documentary won an award from the British Academy of Film and Television Arts.

See also
Sex Crimes and the Vatican

External links
Suing the Pope: Your comments

Catholic Church sexual abuse scandals in Ireland
Curial response to Catholic Church sexual abuse scandals
Media coverage of Catholic Church sexual abuse scandals
2002 films
Documentary films about child abuse
Documentary films about Catholicism
BBC television documentaries
BAFTA winners (films)
2002 in Christianity
2000s British films